Alexander Piasecky (February 1, 1917 – September 16, 1992) was an American football end in the National Football League for the Washington Redskins.  He played college football at Duke University.

1917 births
1992 deaths
American football wide receivers
Players of American football from Pennsylvania
Duke Blue Devils football players
Sportspeople from Pennsylvania
Washington Redskins players
Georgia Pre-Flight Skycrackers football players
People from Greensburg, Pennsylvania